William Rushworth may refer to:

 William Rushworth (cricketer) (1914–1966), English cricketer
 William Rushworth (trade unionist) (1879–1929), English trade union leader
 William Rushworth (organ builder) (1807–?), English organ builder